Safita District is a district of the Tartus Governorate in northwestern Syria. Administrative centre is the city of Safita. At the 2004 census, the district had a population of 129,632.

Sub-districts
The district of Safita is divided into six sub-districts or nawāḥī (population as of 2004):
Safita Subdistrict (ناحية صافيتا): population 60,172.
Mashta al-Helu Subdistrict (ناحية مشتى الحلو): population 12,577.
Al-Bariqiyah Subdistrict (ناحية البارقية): population 7,336.
Sebei Subdistrict (ناحية سبة): population 7,614.
Al-Sisiniyah Subdistrict (ناحية السيسنية): population 22,018.
Ras al-Khashufah Subdistrict (ناحية رأس الخشوفة): population 19,915.

References